Lokring Technology is a privately held international company headquartered in Willoughby, Ohio that serves over 30 countries worldwide. The Chairman and President of the company is William Lennon, the grandson of Fred A. Lennon, founder of Swagelok.

Lokring designs patented, weld equivalent pipe and tube fittings such as couplings, flanges, elbows, adapters, and more. The unique technology of the patented Lokring fittings utilize Elastic Strain Preload
(ESP), and possesses a metal to metal leak-free seal that compresses or swages the pipe/tube wall.

The company is prominent in the Shipbuilding, Submarine (Marine), Oil & Gas (Upstream and Downstream), and Nuclear Generation Industries, but also caters to other markets such as Steel, Pharmaceutical, Medical Gas, Railroad, and many more.

Company history
The Lokring Joint was originally invented to replace the Apollo Joint in the Apollo I: Saturn Mission in 1968. In 1988, Robert Benson, Lucien Ruby, and Chris Dietemann formed Lokring Technology. By 1989, Lokring had completed its first full year of operations successfully. By 1994, Lokring was listed in the top 500 rising companies on Inc.com. Wabtec Corporation (formerly a George Westinghouse company) purchased Lokring Technology in 1998 and moved the plant to Burlington, Ontario. In 2002, Lokring Technology was purchased by William Lennon, a fluid system component entrepreneur and venture capitalist.

Technology 
Lokring patented connectors do not use elastomeric or rubber seals, O-rings, or gaskets. The Lokring patented connectors create their seal by shaping the pipe wall first elastically and then plastically with the connector. The connectors, based on helium testing, have a volatile organic compound emission rate that is no greater than 2.4*10-12 kilograms per hour or 4.6*10-8 pounds per year.

The technology works like this: during a piping installation, the axial movement of the Lokring driver over the fitting body swages the body onto the pipe surface, compressing the pipe wall first elastically and then plastically. When the pipe wall resists this swaging action, it generates high unit compressive loads at the contact points. These contact stresses are high enough to plastically yield the pipe surface under the multiple sealing lands, forming a 360-degree circumferential, permanent, metal-to-metal seal between the pipe and fitting body. Finally, the installation process causes the Lokring driver to grow slightly in diameter — an "elastic strain" — so that it exerts an elastic, radial preload on the metallic seals. This secures the fitting for the life of the connection.

Lokring Introduces the LTCS-333 Corrosion Resistant Process Fitting

Several years ago, Lokring saw the opportunity to better serve the marketplace by developing a product that achieves the same integrity as welding but removes many of the challenges and long-term costs of hot work. In January 2010, the company introduced a new LTCS-333 Process Fitting, based on its tested ESP technology. Using the same design, LTCS-333 Fittings incorporated a new material — low temp 4130 carbon steel — that provided a new scope of capabilities for users.

Notable Uses 
ExxonMobil identified a new alternative to hot work welding during their MEV (Maintenance Efficiency Venture) initiative in 2007 when they came across a pipe-fitting technology created by Lokring.  At the time, Lokring was already a supplier to ExxonMobil. ExxonMobil’s MEV decision to support the use of Lokring’s pipe-fitting technology – which requires no heat, is quick to install, and can be used by properly trained technicians without any welding experience – strengthened the relationship between the two companies. The resulting gains have been tremendous: productivity and overall cost savings of about two-thirds in many
settings and much improved safety due to the departure from hot work. This expanded partnership has benefited both companies: a safer, less-expensive technology for ExxonMobil and its facilities worldwide, and enhanced comprehension of and greater accessibility to foreign markets for Lokring.

Indeed, ExxonMobil’s support of Lokring’s pipe-fitting technology has helped to promote the expansion of Lokring into new countries.  Japan is one prominent beneficiary of the MEV partnership, prior to which Lokring had no presence. MEV worked with Lokring in order to meet Japanese piping specifications to use the Lokring product in ExxonMobil’s local facilities. In addition, ExxonMobil’s Japanese subsidiaries drove Lokring to establish in-country distribution channels to service new customers in additional industries. As Lokring President William Lennon states, "Our ExxonMobil partnership has been a catalyst for our international expansion. There is no doubt that this partnership allowed us to enter the Japanese market years earlier — and much stronger — than we would
have if entering on our own. Our global expansion has created jobs in these countries and in Ohio as well."

References

External links 

EIC EnergyFocus UK Publication

Companies based in Cleveland
Privately held companies based in Ohio
Companies established in 1988